= Lower atmosphere =

Lower atmosphere is a collective term sometimes used to refer to various layers of the atmosphere of the Earth and corresponding regions of the atmospheres of other planets, and includes:

- The troposphere, which on Earth extends from the surface to an altitude of about 12 kilometres (7.5 mi)
- The stratosphere, which on Earth lies between the altitudes of about 12 kilometres (7.5 mi) and 50 kilometres (31 mi), sometimes considered part of the "middle atmosphere" rather than the lower atmosphere
